Talhoukia is a genus of moths in the family Noctuidae. It contains the single species Talhoukia feifae, which is found in Saudi Arabia.

References

Natural History Museum Lepidoptera generic names catalog
Talhoukia at funet

Noctuidae